Miha Žvižej (born 6 November 1987) is a professional handball player from Slovenia. He is currently playing in Denmark for TTH Holstebro.

Recently, he represented Slovenia at the 2015 World Men's Handball Championship. Before that, he played at the 2010 European Men's Handball Championship.

His brother Luka Žvižej is also a professional handball player.

References

1987 births
Living people
Sportspeople from Celje
Slovenian male handball players
Expatriate handball players
Slovenian expatriate sportspeople in France
Slovenian expatriate sportspeople in Denmark